The 1998 NCAA Division I-AA Football Championship Game was a postseason college football game between the Georgia Southern Eagles and the UMass Minutemen. The game was played on December 19, 1998, at Finley Stadium, home field of the University of Tennessee at Chattanooga. The culminating game of the 1998 NCAA Division I-AA football season, it was won by UMass, 55–43.

Teams
The participants of the Championship Game were the finalists of the 1998 I-AA Playoffs, which began with a 16-team bracket.

UMass Minutemen

UMass finished their regular season with an 8–3 record (6–2 in conference); two of their losses had been to rival Connecticut, with one considered a non-conference game. Seeded 11th in the playoffs, the Minutemen defeated sixth-seed McNeese State, 14-seed Lehigh, and second-seed Northwestern State to reach the final. This was the second appearance for UMass in a Division I-AA championship game, having lost to Florida A&M in the 1978 inaugural title game.

Georgia Southern Eagles

Georgia Southern finished their regular season with an 11–0 record (8–0 in conference). The Eagles, seeded first, defeated 16-seed Colgate, eighth-seed Connecticut, and fourth-seed Western Illinois to reach the final. This was the sixth appearance for Georgia Southern in a Division I-AA championship game, having four prior wins (1985, 1986, 1989, 1990) and one prior loss (1988).

Game summary

Scoring summary

Game statistics

References

Further reading

External links
2018 UMass Hall of Fame: The 1998 Football Team via YouTube
 

Championship Game
NCAA Division I Football Championship Games
Georgia Southern Eagles football games
UMass Minutemen football games
College football in Tennessee
American football competitions in Chattanooga, Tennessee
NCAA Division I-AA Football Championship Game
NCAA Division I-AA Football Championship Game